Big Brother 2009, also known as Big Brother 10, was the tenth series of the British reality television series Big Brother. The show followed a total of twenty-two contestants, who were isolated from the outside world for an extended period of time in a custom built House. Each week, one or more of the housemates were evicted by a public vote. The last remaining housemate, Sophie Reade, was declared the winner, winning a cash prize of £71,320.

The series launched on Channel 4 on 4 June 2009 and ended on 4 September 2009, lasting 93 days – the joint-second longest British edition of Big Brother to date (together with the seventh and ninth series, and one day shorter than the eighth series). Davina McCall returned as presenter for her tenth consecutive year. Sixteen housemates entered on launch night, with an additional six being introduced in later weeks.

Big Brother 10 was watched by an average of 2.5 million viewers. It was the lowest rated series of the show since its inception, becoming the first series to draw an average of less than 3 million, and remains the lowest rated series of Big Brother to be broadcast on Channel 4. During the series, Channel 4 announced that it would not be renewing its contract to show the series with Endemol once it expired in 2010, meaning that the subsequent eleventh series would be the last to be broadcast on Channel 4.

Production

Big Brother 10 was produced by Brighter Pictures, a division of Endemol. This series of the programme had been confirmed since 2006 as part of a £180 million contract between Endemol and Channel 4. Phil Edgar-Jones was the creative director of the series whilst Sharon Powers was the executive producer. Open auditions for the programme, which were confirmed during the final of Celebrity Big Brother 6, began on 3 January 2009 in Edinburgh and ended on 7 February in Manchester. Internet auditioning via YouTube, which saw 2,600 apply, ended on 3 February 2009. Auditionees were subjected to three interviews with various producers, additional meetings with a psychologist and a psychiatrist and a final "talk of doom", in which they were warned about the negative impact that appearing on Big Brother could have on their lives. In the weeks preceding the series, the selected housemates were put into "hiding" with no access to the outside world. Housemates were offered aftercare from the production team for up to six months after they left the programme.

Eye logo
The programme's logo, the Big Brother Eye, is based on a black, purple and blue thumbprint and was released on 11 May. It was designed by Daniel Eatock. From 19 May, Channel 4 began uploading teaser clips to the official Big Brother UK YouTube channel; these were also aired during commercial breaks on Channel 4 and its related channels. The series was sponsored by Lucozade Energy and the promotional break bumpers were created by M&C Saatchi and are based upon a 'little brother versus big brother' scenario. The programme began on 4 June, with a 95-minute special programme which introduced the initial 16 participants, and was broadcast on Channel 4 and E4 over a period of 93 days, concluding with the final on 4 September.

Broadcasts
The main television coverage of Big Brother 10 was screened using daily highlights programmes, narrated by Marcus Bentley. These episodes summarised the events of the previous day in the House. Alongside these highlights shows were spin-off programmes, Big Brother's Big Mouth and Big Brother's Little Brother, that commented on fandom, cultural reaction to the events within the House and included interviews with celebrities, former housemates and family and friends of housemates. On Fridays, a live eviction programme was hosted by Davina McCall in which the evicted contestant left the house and received an interview from McCall and two guests. For 2009, BBLB returned with George Lamb presenting five weekday evening programmes and one Sunday edition per week. Big Mouth was also fronted by McCall and was broadcast on E4 on Friday nights for an hour after the main eviction programme.

Interview panel
In a change to normal eviction interviews this series saw McCall and the evictee on a panel joined by two celebrity fans or psychologists, joining them were:
Sophia Judi James and Dom Joly
Cairon Iain Lee and Vanessa Feltz
Angel Anthea Turner
Sree Kelly Osbourne
Kris Mel Blatt
Karly Judi James and Kathy Burke
Kenneth Terry Christian
Nóirín Judi James and Jo Whiley
Hira Emma Kennedy and Bob Mortimer
Freddie Judi James and John McCririck
Bea Ulrika Jonsson
Marcus Grace Dent
Lisa Dave Schneider and Kim Woodburn

The panel was not used for the finale, however, Judi James made a recorded segment about each finalist. The panel format was scrapped for the following celebrity and regular series, where McCall interviewed the evictee in the traditional format.

House
As with each series since Big Brother 2002, the programme was filmed at Elstree Studios in Borehamwood, Hertfordshire. A total of 27 editing suites, manned by over 300 members of staff, were situated in the "George Lucas Stage" to produce the programme. In the 18 May issue of Star magazine, aerial photographs of the House were published, showing the garden under construction. Official pictures of the House interior were released by Channel 4 on 1 June, showing the entrance stairway, living room and garden. The entrance stairway had images of insects on its walls whilst the garden and living room had a science fiction theme; the former included a bus stop as the designated smoking area. On 3 June, Metro published an image of the Diary Room, which has a multicoloured chair and wall pattern. There was also a shipping container-based bathroom, a sitting room with red sofas, a wood panelled kitched with purple, black and white fittings and a bedroom with splats of paint covering the walls. The house contained 44 cameras, 75 two-way mirrors and 57 fixed microphones, as well as individual microphones for each housemate.

Format

The format remained largely unchanged from previous series. Housemates were incarcerated in the Big Brother House with no contact to and from the outside world. Each week, the housemates took part in a compulsory task that determined the amount of money they were allocated to spend on their shopping; if they passed, they received a luxury budget and they were allocated a basic budget if they failed. Housemates were instructed to nominate two fellow housemates for eviction each week. This compulsory vote was conducted in the privacy of the Diary Room and housemates were not allowed to discuss the nomination process or influence the nominations of others. On Day 68, Big Brother changed the rules to allow housemates to discuss nominations until further notice. The two or more housemates who gathered the most nominations per week faced a public vote and the housemate receiving the most votes was evicted from the House on the Friday and interviewed by Davina McCall. Housemates could voluntarily leave the House at any time and those who broke the rules could have been ejected by Big Brother.

In a change from previous series, Channel 4 announced that it would no longer donate any of its income from the premium-rate telephone lines, by which viewers vote for whom they would like to see evicted or win the programme, to charitable organisations. The broadcaster said that the current economic downturn is to blame for this decision and that the change would bring Big Brother into line with other programmes of its kind, such as The X Factor and Strictly Come Dancing. The format of the live eviction interview programme was altered for this series. Unlike previous series in which McCall interviewed evicted housemates by herself, she was instead joined by two guest panellists to "interrogate" the evictee. Panellists included former housemates, journalists, psychologists, and fans of the programme. A new rule was added to the programme at the start of the series; "fake romances" were not permitted.

Housemates
Big Brother 10 saw 22 contestants competing to win. Sixteen participants entered the House on Day 1 and an additional five housemates entered the House on Day 44, followed by one other on Day 56.

 Angel McKenzie (born 10 June 1973) is a 35-year-old professional boxer and artist from Moscow, Russia. She is the adoptive daughter of former British and European light welterweight boxing champion, Clinton McKenzie She became a housemate as the result of a public vote on Day 4. She kept her birthday a secret from her fellow housemates, celebrating it alone in the Diary Room. On Day 21, in a special live nominations show, she was nominated for the first time. On Day 23, became the fourth housemate to be evicted with 81% of the public vote.
 Rebecca "Bea" Hamill entered the House on Day 44 with four other new housemates. Alongside them she was tasked with ensuring that Nóirín and Halfwit received the most nominations but refused to participate claiming it went against her morals. She was evicted on Day 79, in week twelve just one week before the final.
 Beinazir Lasharie (born 8 January 1981) is a study support assistant from Pakistan. Her family, after receiving death threats due to their support of former Pakistani Prime Minister Benazir Bhutto were given asylum in the United Kingdom when she was a year old. On Day 4, Beinazir did not gain full housemate status by public vote and became the first evictee. There was no crowd present as she left the House and she was escorted from the premises in a red AEC Routemaster bus.
 Cairon Reon Austin-Hill (born 5 July 1990) is a student and the youngest contestant in this year's Big Brother.
 Charles Andrew "Charlie" Drummond (born 3 January 1987) is a 22-year-old Jobcentre customer service advisor from Cleadon.
 David Ramsden (born 2 September 1980) is a clothing recycler from Dewsbury, near Leeds in West Yorkshire. He entered the House on Day 44 with four other new housemates. With them he was tasked with ensuring that Nóirín and Halfwit received the most nominations, but the new housemates failed their task and faced the public vote, though the eviction was ultimately cancelled. On Day 91, David celebrated his 29th birthday, and he received a birthday message from fashion designer Vivienne Westwood, who he claims is his hero. David has also been on UK television show Golden Balls. He finished 3rd

 Frederick "Freddie/Halfwit" George Fisher, (born 21 June 1985) is an Oxford graduate. On Day 26, Halfwit was nominated for eviction along with Sree, surviving for the fourth consecutive time on Day 30 with 15% of the public vote. Halfwit survived the most consecutive evictions out of anyone in the history of the show, having survived the public vote 5 times in a row and 7 times in total. On Day 72 as a special prize, Halfwit and Dogface legally changed their names back to Freddie and Sophie. On the same day Freddie was evicted from the house over Marcus gaining 53.6% of the public vote to evict.
 Hira Habibshah entered on Day 44, and was given a secret mission in which she had to brief her fellow new housemates, it involved ensuring that Nóirín and Halfwit were nominated. The task was failed, resulting in her nomination along with the other new housemates. On Day 59, she was named the 'Most Entertaining Housemate' by Big Brother. On Day 65 she became the ninth person to be evicted with 5.65% of the public vote.
 Isaac Stout was a castmember on MTV's The Real World: Sydney in 2007 where he entered into a relationship with fellow Housemate Nóirín during the series despite his fear of commitment. He ends up walking out of the House after Nóirín is evicted on Day 58.
 Karly Ashworth (born 14 April 1988) is a part-time glamour model from Fife in Scotland. She was polled as one of FHM's Top High Street Honeys. She became the seventh housemate after being tricked into believing that she had a motorbike ridden over her stomach. On Day 39, Karly was nominated for eviction by her fellow housemates. Karly was evicted on Day 44, the same night as her boyfriend, Kenneth, entered the house as a new housemate.
 Kenneth Tong entered the house on Day 44, minutes before his girlfriend Karly was evicted. Alongside his fellow new housemates, he had to ensure that both Nóirín and Halfwit were nominated for eviction but the new housemates failed their task so faced the public vote. On Day 50, Kenneth fled the house via the rooftop with Marcus' assistance. As a result, the eviction for week eight was cancelled.
 Kris Donnelly became the fourth person to be confirmed as a housemate when he was selected by Lisa, who had earned the privilege to choose by answering a ringing phone. On Day 33, Big Brother told Kris to remain silent until 2 a.m. as punishment for discussing nominations or automatically face the public vote. He failed to keep quiet and faced eviction. On Day 37, he was evicted with 63% of the public vote. Kris was voted as the 3rd best looking housemate there's ever been. 
 Lisa Elizabeth Wallace (born 12 February 1968) is the oldest contestant in the series who entered the House with a distinctive pink mohican haircut, which she shaved off during the series. She became the third person to be rewarded with housemate status when she answered a ringing telephone. She was evicted on day 90 in the final eviction of the series with 68.59% to evict.
 Marcus Akin (born 10 August 1973) was made a housemate as the result of a public vote on Day 4. On Day 29, Marcus was warned about comments he made to fellow housemate Sree, which Marcus hotly denied. On Day 50, he helped Kenneth Tong escape from the Big Brother house. Marcus was the twelfth housemate to be evicted with 64% of the vote on day 86.
 Nóirín Kelly also appeared on The Real World: Sydney in 2007 as the girlfriend of fellow contestant Isaac Stout. She was granted housemate status when she allowed Rodrigo to shave her eyebrows and draw a moustache and glasses with permanent marker on her face. She had to do this every day until further notice. On Day 58, Nóirín was evicted from the Big Brother house with 60.0% of the public vote. Outside of the house in September 2009 Norin appeared on the front cover of Nuts and 10 pages of the magazine consisted of pictures of her and an interview with her.
 Rodrigo Lopes (born 1 December 1985) is a Brazilian student living in Leeds. Rodrigo was the twelfth person to enter the house and earned housemate status after convincing Nóirín to allow her eyebrows to be shaved and to draw a moustache and glasses on her face under the order of Big Brother. At the time of Big Brother's filming, she presented and identified as male, but she now identifies as female and is now known as Rebekah Shelton.
 Saffia May Corden (born 14 October 1981) is a beauty consultant from Hucknall, Nottingham and single mother of two children. She became a housemate for successfully walking barefoot on broken sugar glass, believing it to be real glass. She walked from the House on Day 8.
 Siavash Sabbaghpour (born 25 April 1986) is an event organiser who left his homeland Iran at an early age to live in London. Siavash was made a housemate as the result of a public vote on Day 4 and finished in second place.
 Sophia Brown was made a housemate as the result of a public vote on Day 4. On Day 6 Sophia was nominated for eviction by her fellow housemates. On Day 9 she became the second evictee with 91.2% of the public vote. Sophia died on 17 May 2012.

 Sophie/Dogface Victoria Reade (born 18 May 1989) is a glamour model from Nantwich, Cheshire, has appeared in Hot Shots Calendar and was the winner of the series. Reade changed her name by deed poll to Dogface, to become a house-mate during the show's first week. On Day 33 Big Brother told Reade that she had to remain silent until 2 am as punishment for discussing nominations; she failed to keep quiet and therefore faced the public vote. Reade had a romantic relationship with Kris in the House. On Day 39 she and Siavash were punished by Big Brother for talking about nominations, and told they were not allowed to swear before 3 pm; they both failed and faced eviction. On Day 72, as a special prize, Dogface (Reade) legally changed her name back to Sophie. Since Day 88, Sophie was the bookies' favourite to win. She left the house to huge cheers and a lively crowd chanting her name.
 Sree Dasari (born 14 September 1984) is from India. A students' union president, he was in the United Kingdom studying for a master's degree in International Business at the University of Hertfordshire in Hatfield. He was made a housemate as the result of a public vote on Day 4. On Day 31, with 85% of the public vote, Sree became the fifth evictee and crowned Best Housemate Award for the season 10. He attempted suicide by slashing his wrists shortly after being evicted.
 Thomas "Tom" Oliver (born 3 April 1982) entered on Day 44. On Day 53, Tom voluntarily left the Big Brother after 9 days.

Weekly summary

Nominations table

Notes

 : As they did not achieve housemate status by successfully completing a challenge, Angel, Beinazir, Marcus, Siavash, Sophia and Sree faced a public vote on Day 4 to decide which five remaining non-housemates would be given housemate status. Beinazir received the fewest votes and was therefore evicted.
 : Siavash, playing King Henry VIII in the week's shopping task, was called upon to ban one housemate from nominating and to grant another immunity. He chose Charlie and Marcus respectively.
 : As punishment for discussing nominations, Charlie, Dogface and Kris had to remain silent for several hours or they would automatically face eviction. All three failed this task and automatically faced eviction.
 : As punishment for discussing nominations, Dogface and Siavash were told not to swear for several hours or they would automatically face eviction. They failed to do so and therefore automatically faced eviction. As this took place before nominations, they were ineligible to be nominated by their fellow housemates.
 : As new housemates, Bea, David, Hira, Kenneth and Tom could not nominate and could not be nominated by their fellow housemates. However, they were set a secret mission, in which they had to get Halfwit and Nóirín (who were randomly chosen by Hira) nominated for eviction by the other housemates. Failure meant automatically facing the public vote. Charlie and Lisa received the most nominations, therefore the new housemates failed their mission and faced eviction themselves. As punishment for discussing nominations, Charlie, Dogface (who also failed to nominate the required two people for eviction this week), Halfwit, Marcus, Nóirín and Siavash also faced the public vote and Big Brother voided all nominations. Therefore, Lisa and Rodrigo were the only two housemates not to face eviction this week. The eviction was later cancelled due to Kenneth walking from the house. During the time the lines were available to vote, Kenneth had received the most votes.
 : Bea and Marcus received the most nominations, however Big Brother declared the result void due to Marcus attempting to influence his fellow housemates on several occasions and Siavash refusing to nominate. As punishment, all housemates faced the public vote. Unlike previous weeks, this week was a vote to save.
 : On Day 72, Big Brother announced to Halfwit and Dogface that they would revert their names back by deed poll to Freddie and Sophie respectively. As he was evicted on the evening of that same day, the table lists Freddie and not Halfwit as the tenth person to be evicted.
 : Siavash and Sophie both refused to nominate. As punishment Big Brother decided, without telling them, that the first two housemates with whom Siavash made physical contact and the first two that Sophie named after leaving the Diary Room would be deemed to be their nominations. Siavash touched Bea and Sophie, and Sophie named Rodrigo and Bea. Therefore, Bea received an additional two nominations and Sophie and Rodrigo each received one extra nomination.
 : As a warning to anyone considering to disrupt the nominations process this week, Big Brother chose Charlie and Sophie at random and announced to the House that they would each automatically receive one nomination from anyone refusing to nominate.
 : Any housemate who refused to nominate this week was automatically put up for eviction.
 : There were no nominations after Lisa's eviction on Day 90. The public voted for whom they wanted to win, rather than evict.

Tenth year commemorations

Additional programming

Three special, one-off programmes aired on E4 before the launch to commemorate ten years of the programme. The first of which, entitled Jade: As Seen On TV aired on 26 May and commented on the life of Big Brother 2002 contestant Jade Goody and the infamy that surrounded her. The most successful Big Brother housemate worldwide, Goody died of cervical cancer two months before the programme aired. The programme was watched by 305,000 people; 1.8% of the TV audience.

Big Brother's Big Quiz, hosted by Davina McCall, aired on 29 May and featured celebrity team captains singer Jamelia, TV presenter and Celebrity Big Brother winner Ulrika Jonsson and comedians Danny Wallace and Jack Whitehall. It also featured former Big Brother housemates such as Craig Phillips and Sam and Amanda Marchant.

Big Brother: A Decade in the Headlines was transmitted on 30 May and looked back at the social, political and cultural changes that Big Brother had made to society since it began. The documentary was hosted by Grace Dent and featured participation from Mark Frith, Carole Malone, Oona King, Peter Tatchell, Krishnan Guru-Murthy and Ian Hyland.

Spin-off programme Big Brother's Little Brother featured new competitions and features to mark the event. The first, The George Lamb Quiz of the Decade, was launched on 7 June. The participants had to show their knowledge of the programme by participating in a quiz relating to every series of Big Brother.  Another competition was established as part of the Greek-themed task in week eight. Here, male Big Brother's Little Brother viewers were asked to apply to become a date for Bea Hammill, who was playing the role of Aphrodite. The contestant chosen was Robin from Bristol. The programme also offered a viewer the chance to become Big Brother and talk to the housemates via the Diary Room on the final day of the programme; this was won by Simon "Jobby" Jobson, a 22-year-old DJ from Alnwick, Northumberland. Former housemates, such as Nadia Almada and Rachel Rice, also appeared as guests to mark the occasion.

Week seven shopping task

The shopping task for week seven saw housemates from the previous nine series temporarily return, as current housemates competed against them in a series of "classic" tasks. Former housemates were not paid; a donation was made to Jade Goody's trust fund instead. Phillips was drafted in after "Nasty" Nick Bateman withdrew. Later that day, Lisa competed in a task to build a sugar cube tower alongside Dean O'Loughlin of series two. Day 41 saw Alex Sibley, Sophie Pritchard and Lee Davey from the programme's third edition compete in a re-creation of the egg and spoon race task with Rodrigo trying to predict the outcome. Later that day, Federico Martone from series four participated in a gymkhana competition against Nóirín using fake horses and Dogface and Michelle Bass both sang Pie Jesu, which featured in the wedding task of series five, with viewers deciding which performance was the best. On Day 42, Craig Coates and Makosi Musambasi challenged Siavash to the box task from the sixth series and series seven's Nikki Grahame reenacted her silent disco task alongside Karly. The task drew to a close on Day 43 when Rex Newmark from the previous series returned to participate in the electric shock task with Marcus, in which the rest of housemates were subjected to shocks. The housemates failed to pass the required minimum of seven of the nine challenges and therefore failed the overall task.

Reception

In comparison with other contemporary reality television programmes and previous editions of Big Brother, this series has received lower viewing figures and less press coverage. One Bookmaker reported the series had attracted the lowest amount of bets placed in a single day for any reality programme in the last decade. Four weeks before the programme began, former chat show presenter Michael Parkinson was critical of the programme; "I object to the exploitation of the underclass in shows like Big Brother. It is the modern version of Bedlam, where you pay to see the poor benighted people making asses of themselves". Charlie Brooker of The Guardian said that the series contained forgettable participants and that the producers were alienating the viewers with confusing tasks that seemed to take place "every four minutes". Simmy Richman of The Independent wrote that the programme had become predictable after ten editions and that it had a "here-we-go-again feel". They also complained that the format had become clichéd and the housemates stereotypical, and they criticised the producers for enrolling participants who were using the programme as "a springboard to a Heat magazine cover and temporary free entry to dodgy nightclubs". Maggie Brown, writing in her book A Licence to be Different — The Story of Channel 4, believed that the programme limited its broadcaster as the cost to produce the programme were not justified by the number of viewers it attracted. Mark Lawson, also writing in The Guardian, suggested that the lack of viewers linked with a tired format and minimal press coverage, claiming that the newspapers had become preoccupied with stories such as the outbreak of swine flu, death of Michael Jackson and MPs' expenses scandal. Lawson also believed that the death of Big Brother 2002 participant Jade Goody prior to the launch of Big Brother 2009 contributed to the low viewing figures. Journalist James Donaghy branded the programme a "sorry atrocity" and celebrity gossip blogger Darryn Lyons said that the series had been "massively disappointing", pinpointing Isaac Stout's entrance as a "desperate stunt" to attract viewers. Despite returning to the House to participate in a task, former housemate Dean O'Loughlin has also been critical of this series, describing it as "way too superficial".

However, the series has also received praise from various parties. For example, Gerard Gilbert of The Independent argued that in comparison to contemporary TV dramas, Big Brother provides much more entertainment, psychological depth and social impact. Gilbert also commented that the storylines of the programme were equal to that of the works of Samuel Beckett. Craig Phillips, the winner of the first series of Big Brother, and the programme's presenter Davina McCall have responded to the criticisms of the programme's decreasing viewing figures, respectively arguing that the programme achieves low numbers due to the different way in which viewers can watch the programme and that the programme is achieving well considering its timeslot and broadcaster. Brian Dowling, who won the second edition of Big Brother in 2001, defended both the programme and the reality genre as a whole, telling BBC Breakfast that producers were simply providing viewers what they want, such as extreme participants. The Guardian'''s Heidi Stephens also complimented the series by claiming that it has "seen the emergence of some truly fascinating personalities" and welcomed the return to the basic format of the programme. Stephens went on to compare the storylines and characters of the programme with that of a John Hughes film. Aisleyne Horgan-Wallace, who came third in the seventh series, and Big Brother 2003 winner Cameron Stout praised the selection of housemates, both claiming that the quality of the programme had improved on previous years. Entertainment website Digital Spy was also complimentary of the series, naming Sophie "Dogface" Reade and Kris Donnelly as two of the sexiest housemates of the past ten years and Angel McKenzie as one of the most outrageous. Towards the end of the programme's airing, Neil Boom of The Independent argued that the series is "one of the best ever" despite a decline in the number of viewers. He claimed that there was still high interest on internet forums and that the lower television ratings might be due to the removal of the 24-hour live feed. He praised the selection of housemates and highlighted Siavash, Freddie and Marcus as particular examples. Following the end of the series, Davina McCall also considered Big Brother 10'' to be "Big Brother at its best."

Viewing figures
These viewing figures are taken from BARB.

References

External links
 Official website
 

2009 British television seasons
 10
Television shows shot at Elstree Film Studios